Deltomerodes is a genus of ground beetles in the family Carabidae. There are about 15 described species in Deltomerodes.

Species
These 15 species belong to the genus Deltomerodes:

 Deltomerodes chulii J.Schmidt, 1995  (Nepal)
 Deltomerodes conaensis Yan; H.Shi; Liang & J.Shi, 2021  (China)
 Deltomerodes grilli J.Schmidt & Hartmann, 1998  (Nepal)
 Deltomerodes kryzhanovskii Zamotajlov, 1999  (China)
 Deltomerodes memorabilis Deuve, 1992  (China)
 Deltomerodes miroshnikovi Zamotajlov, 1999  (China)
 Deltomerodes murzini Zamotajlov, 1999  (China)
 Deltomerodes nepalensis J.Schmidt, 1994  (Nepal)
 Deltomerodes ovicollis Yan; H.Shi; Liang & J.Shi, 2021  (China)
 Deltomerodes schawalleri J.Schmidt, 1998  (Nepal)
 Deltomerodes schmidti Zamotajlov, 1999  (Nepal)
 Deltomerodes sciakyi J.Schmidt, 1996  (Nepal)
 Deltomerodes stenomus (Andrewes, 1936)  (India)
 Deltomerodes wrasei Zamotajlov, 1999  (China)
 Deltomerodes zolotichini Zamotajlov, 1999  (China)

References

Carabidae